Khvajeh Rowshanai (also Romanized as Khvājeh Rowshanā’ī; also known as Khājeh Rowshanā’ī, Khvājeh Roshnai, and Khwāja Roshnai) is a village in Pasakuh Rural District, Zavin District, Kalat County, Razavi Khorasan Province, Iran. At the 2006 census, its population was 11, in 4 families.

References 

Populated places in Kalat County